Baseball competitions at the 2015 Pan American Games in Toronto was held from July 11 to 26 at the Pan Am Ball Park, in Ajax, Ontario. 

Women's baseball made its Pan American Games debut, after being added to the program at the 2013 Pan American Sports Organization's general assembly. A total of seven men's and five women's teams competed in each tournament respectively.

Competition schedule

The following was the competition schedule for the baseball competitions:

Medal summary

Medal table

Medalists

Qualification
A total of seven men's teams and five women's team qualified to compete at the games. For the men's tournament, the host nation Canada along with the United States (for its contributions to the game) qualified automatically. The top four teams at the 2014 Central American and Caribbean Games also qualified. The last qualifier saw one team qualify from the 2015 South American Championships. For the women's tournament, Canada as host nation qualified automatically, along with the top four nations at the qualification event held in March 2015. Men's rosters can have a maximum of 24 athletes, while women's rosters can have a maximum of 18 athletes.

Men

Women

Participating nations
A total of eight countries qualified baseball teams. The numbers in parenthesis represents the number of participants qualified.

References

 
Events at the 2015 Pan American Games
2015
Pan American Games
2015 Pan American Games
Baseball in Ontario